Yoshiteru Nishi (born 23 January 1962) is a Japanese chef.

Career

In 2004, Nishi was appointed chef of the Japan national football team.

References

External links

 Interview with Yoshiteru Nishi (1)
 Interview with Yoshiteru Nishi (2)
 Interview with Yoshiteru Nishi (3) 

1962 births
Japan national football team
Japanese chefs
Living people